The meridian 6° west of Greenwich is a line of longitude that extends from the North Pole across the Arctic Ocean, the Atlantic Ocean, Europe, Africa, the Southern Ocean, and Antarctica to the South Pole.

The 6th meridian west forms a great circle with the 174th meridian east.

From Pole to Pole
Starting at the North Pole and heading south to the South Pole, the 6th meridian west passes through:

{| class="wikitable plainrowheaders"
! scope="col" width="125" | Co-ordinates
! scope="col" | Country, territory or sea
! scope="col" | Notes
|-
| style="background:#b0e0e6;" | 
! scope="row" style="background:#b0e0e6;" | Arctic Ocean
| style="background:#b0e0e6;" |
|-valign="top"
| style="background:#b0e0e6;" | 
! scope="row" style="background:#b0e0e6;" | Atlantic Ocean
| style="background:#b0e0e6;" | Passing just east of the island of Fugloy,  (at ) Passing just east of the island of Svínoy,  (at ) Passing just west of the island of North Rona, Scotland,  (at ) Passing just east of the island of Sula Sgeir, Scotland,  (at )
|-valign="top"
| style="background:#b0e0e6;" | 
! scope="row" style="background:#b0e0e6;" | The Minch
| style="background:#b0e0e6;" | Passing just east of the isle of Lewis, Scotland,  (at )
|-
| 
! scope="row" | 
| Scotland — islands of South Rona, Raasay, Scalpay, Skye
|-
| style="background:#b0e0e6;" | 
! scope="row" style="background:#b0e0e6;" | Atlantic Ocean
| style="background:#b0e0e6;" | Sea of the Hebrides
|-valign="top"
| 
! scope="row" | 
| Scotland — peninsulas of Ardnamurchan and Morvern, and the Isle of Mull
|-
| style="background:#b0e0e6;" | 
! scope="row" style="background:#b0e0e6;" | Atlantic Ocean
| style="background:#b0e0e6;" | Firth of Lorn
|-
| 
! scope="row" | 
| Scotland — island of Jura
|-valign="top"
| style="background:#b0e0e6;" | 
! scope="row" style="background:#b0e0e6;" | Atlantic Ocean
| style="background:#b0e0e6;" | Sound of Jura — passing just east of the island of Islay, Scotland,  (at ) North Channel — passing just east of Rathlin Island, Northern Ireland,  (at )
|-
| 
! scope="row" | 
| Northern Ireland — passing just west of Belfast (at )
|-valign="top"
| style="background:#b0e0e6;" | 
! scope="row" style="background:#b0e0e6;" | Irish Sea
| style="background:#b0e0e6;" | Passing just east of Lambay Island,  (at ) Passing just east of Howth Head,  (at  near Dublin) Passing just east of Wicklow Head,  (at )
|-valign="top"
| style="background:#b0e0e6;" | 
! scope="row" style="background:#b0e0e6;" | Atlantic Ocean
|-
| 
! scope="row" | 
| Passing just west of Seville (at )
|-
| style="background:#b0e0e6;" | 
! scope="row" style="background:#b0e0e6;" | Atlantic Ocean
| style="background:#b0e0e6;" |
|-
| 
! scope="row" | 
|
|-
| 
! scope="row" | 
|
|-
| 
! scope="row" | 
|
|-
| 
! scope="row" | 
|
|-
| 
! scope="row" | 
|
|-
| 
! scope="row" | 
|
|-
| 
! scope="row" | 
|
|-valign="top"
| style="background:#b0e0e6;" | 
! scope="row" style="background:#b0e0e6;" | Atlantic Ocean
|-
| style="background:#b0e0e6;" | 
! scope="row" style="background:#b0e0e6;" | Southern Ocean
| style="background:#b0e0e6;" |
|-
| 
! scope="row" | Antarctica
| Queen Maud Land, claimed by 
|-
|}

See also
5th meridian west
7th meridian west

w006 meridian west